KMXV (93.3 FM "Mix 93.3") is a Top 40 (CHR) station based in Kansas City, Missouri, United States. The Steel City Media outlet operates with an ERP of 100 kW. Its current slogan is "Kansas City's #1 Hit Music Station". It is also one of two Top 40s competing in the Kansas City Metropolitan Area, the other being KCHZ.  The station's studios are located at Westport Center in Midtown Kansas City, and the transmitter site is in the city's East Side.

History

1958-63: Classical 
The station signed on March 5, 1958 as KCMK-FM (Kansas City, Missouri/Kansas) with 35,000 watts of power. The station primarily aired classical music, with some other types of music thrown in.

1963-69: Country 
In 1963, the station began airing a country music format. DJ Jack Wesley "Cactus Jack" Call was at the station (from KCKN) for one week when he was killed on January 25, 1963 in a car crash. Singer Patsy Cline sang at a benefit for him at Memorial Hall (Kansas City, Kansas) on March 3, 1963.  She was unable to leave Kansas City the next day because the airport was fogged in and was killed in a plane crash on March 5, 1963 en route from Fairfax Airport to Nashville.

For a brief period in mid-1965, KCMK called itself the "oasis in a musical desert." They soon returned to playing country.

1969-71: R&B 
Starting in September 1969, the station aired an R&B format, competing against locally-owned KPRS.

1971-73: Country 
In 1971, the station changed call letter to KWKI and returned to a country music format.

1973-74: Top 40 
For a short time, KWKI had a top 40 format.

1974-78: Rock 
In 1974, KWKI became "The Rock of Kansas City." With this format, it became the first true rock station in Kansas City. The station was initially popular with its progressive rock format, but lost steam with KYYS KYYS signed on with a more mainstream rock presentation.

1978-82: Religious 
In 1978, the station was sold to Jimmy Swaggart Ministries. Religious programming began airing on December 11, 1978. In 1980, KWKI upgraded to 100,000 watts.

1982-91: Soft Adult Contemporary 
In 1982, Great Plains Radio bought KWKI and changed formats to soft adult contemporary on July 4, 1982. The first song on "Classy" was "Kansas City Lights" by Steve Wariner. The station was initially referred to on air as "The New 93," but soon adopted the "Classy 93" moniker. The FCC approved the call letters KLSI on July 4, 1982. By the late 1980s, KLSI dropped the "Classy" name, referring to itself by call letters. Apollo Broadcasting bought the station in 1990.

1991-94: Hot Adult Contemporary 
Following the purchase of the station by Apollo Broadcasting in April 1990, the station rebranded as "Mix 93". In addition, their call letters were changed to KMXV (which were adopted on November 15, 1991), and the station shifted towards the growing Hot AC format.

1994-present: Top 40 
Due to the lack of a full-signaled Top 40 outlet in the market (KISF's signal was mostly East of the city), KMXV began a slow transition to the format in late 1993 and early 1994, shifting the AC format and personalities over to then-sister KUDL. On March 28, 1994, the change to "Mix 93.3" was complete. In the beginning, KMXV offered a heavily dance-leaning rhythmic Top 40 direction, but by 1996, under the direction of new program director Jon Zellner, it had evolved to a more broad-based mainstream Top 40 approach that, at times, leaned towards adult/modern product. By the Spring of 1997, Zellner led KMXV from 14th (a year earlier) to the #1 ranked radio station in Kansas City, a position it held three other times throughout the late 1990s and early 2000s.

During the 1990s, KMXV underwent many ownership changes. Regent Broadcasting bought the station in June 1995, with Jacor purchasing it in October 1996. Jacor then sold the station off to American Radio Systems in July 1997. Westinghouse/CBS bought American Radio Systems' stations (including KMXV) on September 19, 1997. In June 1998, CBS split off the radio division under the revived Infinity Broadcasting name, which would be renamed CBS Radio in December 2005. KMXV was sold off by CBS to Wilks Broadcasting in November 2006 as part of a nationwide reduction of radio stations by CBS. On June 12, 2014, Wilks announced that it was selling its Kansas City cluster (of which KMXV is part of) to Pittsburgh-based Steel City Media. The sale was approved on September 26, 2014, and was consummated on September 30.

Despite being in competition with top 40 station KKSW and rival KCHZ offering more rhythmic content than KMXV (and, to a lesser extent, urban contemporary rivals KPRS, and since 2021, KMJK), KMXV has maintained high ratings for years. However, this changed in late 2010, when KCHZ began overtaking them in the ratings, as that station was ranked #2 with a 6.2 share, while Mix had a 5.6 share and ranked #5 in the market. To combat this, the station began leaning more towards rhythmic content, while slightly edging away from its long-time adult lean, and with sister station KCKC having relaunched its AC format with an upbeat approach in 2014, KMXV has moved more towards a current-based presentation in line with other Top 40/CHRs in the United States.

Red, White, And Boom Annual Show
KMXV produces an annual, day-long concert every year with the title "RED WHITE & BOOM". Artists such as Ashlee Simpson, Def Leppard, Melissa Etheridge, Maroon 5, Kelly Clarkson, Jesse McCartney, Destiny's Child, Daughtry, Pink, Nick Lachey, Bon Jovi, Jordin Sparks, and Lifehouse have performed. It has been running since 1996 when it starred the Spin Doctors, Dog's Eye View and Lisa Loeb. The concert was staged at the Sandstone Amphitheater in Bonner Springs, Kansas, although in 2011, the venue was changed to Worlds of Fun in Kansas City, Missouri.  In 2012, "Red White & Boom" was held at Starlight Theatre on June 23. The following year, it was also held at Starlight Theatre on July 5, where the show was headlined by Carly Rae Jepsen.  In 2014 Fall Out Boy led another successful year for Red White and Boom.

References

External links 

Jenny Matthews in Her Life Magazine

MXV
Contemporary hit radio stations in the United States
Radio stations established in 1958
1958 establishments in Missouri